Mr. Zero may refer to:
 Mr. Freeze or Mr. Zero,  a character in comic books published by DC Comics
 "Mr. Zero" (song), a song by Keith Relf
 an alias of Urbain Ledoux (1874-1941), activist for the unemployed
 Mister Zero, pseudonym of John Picard, guitarist in the Canadian band The Kings
 the protagonist of The Adding Machine by Elmer Rice